Mohammad Al Atrash (born 1934) is a Syrian economist and independent politician who served as a cabinet minister in different periods.

Early life and education
Atrash was born in Tartus in 1934. He received a bachelor's degree from London School of Economics. He also holds a PhD in economics, which he received from the University of London.

Career
Atrash worked as an advisor to the World Bank. He was the director of Syria at the Bank. After public offices, Atrash began to take part in cabinet positions as an independent politician. From 1980 to 1984, he served as economy minister. He resigned from office due to disagreements with then-prime minister Rauf Kasim. He was again named as minister of finance to the cabinet headed by Muhammad Mustafa Mero on 13 December 2001. Atrash's appointment occurred as part of the cabinet reshuffle, and he replaced Khalid Al Mahaini. Atrash's term lasted until 10 September 2003 when he was replaced by Mohammad Al Hussein as finance minister.

Views
Atrash is a moderate socialist and social democrat, believing in controlling the need for change.

References

20th-century Syrian economists
21st-century Syrian economists
1934 births
Alumni of the London School of Economics
Alumni of the University of London
Living people
Syrian ministers of finance
People from Tartus